Squibnocket Ridge is a mountain in Dukes County, Massachusetts. Peaked Hill is located northeast of Squibnocket Ridge.

References

Mountains of Massachusetts
Mountains of Dukes County, Massachusetts